Zene — Mindenki másképp csinálja (‘Music — Everybody does it in a different way’) is the sixth studio album by Hungarian rock band Locomotiv GT, released in 1977. It was the first LGT album with new drummer János Solti and lyricist Dusán Sztevánovity (a former member of 1960s rock band Metró).

Track listing

Side One
"A Rádió" (Gábor Presser, Dusán Sztevánovity) – 6:04
"Egy elkésett dal (S.R. emlékére)" (Presser, Sztevánovity, Presser) – 5:51
"Jóbarátok vagyunk" (Presser) – 3:54
"A Hajnal" (Tamás Somló) – 1:15
"Engedj el" (János Karácsony, Sztevánovity) – 3:47

Side Two
"Mindenki másképp csinálja" (Presser, Sztevánovity) – 6:18
"Visszatérés" (Somló, Sztevánovity) – 5:51
"Aquincumi séta" (Karácsony) – 1:21
"Boogie a zongorán" (Somló, Sztevánovity) – 3:45
"A Búcsú" (Presser) – 3:10

Personnel
Gábor Presser – Yamaha & Fender pianos, clavinet, accordion, Hohner strings, ARP Axxe, percussion, vocals
Tamás Somló – bass guitar, alto saxophone, soprano saxophone, harmonica, percussion, vocals
János Karácsony – guitars, percussion, vocals
János Solti – drums, percussion

with:
László Dés – saxophone
István Bergendy – saxophone
Károly Friedrich – trombone
László Gőz – trombone
Endre Sipos – trumpet
Gyula Bellai – horn
László Balogh – horn
László Mészáros – horn
Ferenc Demjén – vocal (3)
Zorán Sztevanovity – vocal (3)

Production 
Pál Péterdi – Music director
György Kovács – Sound engineer
András Harmati – Graphics

External links
Information at the official LGT website
Lyrics at the official LGT website
Information at the Hungaroton website

Locomotiv GT albums
1977 albums